Žanis is a Latvian masculine given name and may refer to:
Žanis Ansons (1911–1968), Latvian member of Waffen-SS during World War II
Žanis Bahs (1885–1941), Latvian military general
Žanis Blumbergs (1889–1938), Latvian-Soviet military leader 
Žanis Butkus (1906–1999), Latvian Captain in the Waffen SS during World War II
Žanis Lipke (1900–1987), Latvian rescuer of Jews in Riga during World War II
Žanis Peiners (born 1990), Latvian basketball player
Zanis Waldheims (1909–1993), Latvian geometric abstract painter

Latvian masculine given names